These are the official results of the Women's 400 metres event at the 1996 Summer Olympics in Atlanta, Georgia. There were a total of 49 competitors.

Pérec's winning time remains the #4 time in history.  Freeman's second place time remains the #8 time in history.  Ogunkoya and Davis also still rank on the all-time top 20.  Places 3 through 6 are all the fastest times for those places in history and all of the top six, except Miles set their lifetime personal bests in this race.

Results

Heats
Qualification: First 4 in each heat (Q) and the next 4 fastest (q) qualified to the quarterfinals.

Quarterfinals
Qualification: First 4 in each heat (Q) qualified directly to the semifinals.

Semifinals
Qualification: First 4 in each heat (Q) qualified directly to the final.

Final

See also
Men's 400 metres

References

External links
 Official Report
 Results

4
400 metres at the Olympics
1996 in women's athletics
Women's events at the 1996 Summer Olympics